Telford and Wrekin Council is the local authority of Telford and Wrekin in Shropshire, England. It is a unitary authority, having the powers of a non-metropolitan county and district council combined. The district of Telford and Wrekin was granted borough status in 2002, though the council does not ordinarily include "Borough" in its name.

Powers and functions

The local authority derives its powers and functions from the Local Government Act 1972 and subsequent legislation. For the purposes of local government, the Telford and Wrekin is within a non-metropolitan area of England.

As a unitary authority, Telford and Wrekin Council has the powers and functions of both a non-metropolitan county and district council combined. In its capacity as a district council it is a billing authority collecting Council Tax and business rates, it processes local planning applications, it is responsible for housing, waste collection and environmental health. In its capacity as a county council it is a local education authority, responsible for social services, libraries and waste disposal.

The council is currently made up of 35 Labour councillors, 13 Conservative councillors, 4 Liberal Democrats councillors and 2 Independent councillors. There are currently no councillors elected for any other political party. 

There are seven roles within the council. A councillor apart from the party under administration of the Council (Labour) may be appointed to:

 Leader of the Council
 Deputy leader of the Council
 Mayor of the Borough of Telford and Wrekin
 Deputy mayor of the Borough of Telford and Wrekin
 Speaker of the Council
 Deputy Speaker of the Council
 A Council cabinet member

The cabinet is the main decision-making body of the Council with executive powers for all matters, except those held by the full council or those reserved to regulatory committees (such as planning and licensing applications). The cabinet has a key role in budget proposal and policy framework for the Council to adopt.

, the cabinet is chaired by Shaun Davies (Leader of the Council), with ten cabinet members each having responsibility for a particular area of the Council's work.

 Shaun Davies – Leader of the Council
 Richard Overton – Deputy leader of the Council and Cabinet Member for Housing, Enforcement and Transport
 Andy Burford – Cabinet member for adult Social Care and Health, Integration and Transformation
 Eileen Callear – Cabinet Member for Visitor Economy, Employment and Skills
 Lee Carter – Cabinet Member for Neighbourhood Services, Regeneration and the High Street
 Rae Evans – Cabinet Member for Finance, Governance and Customer Services
 Carolyn Healy – Cabinet Member for Climate Change, Green Spaces, Natural and Historic Environment and Cultural Services
 Kelly Middleton – Cabinet Member for Leisure, Public Health and Well-Being, Equalities and Partnerships
 Shirley Reynolds – Cabinet Member for Children, Young People, and Families
 Paul Watling – Cabinet Member for Safer and stronger Communities

References

Unitary authority councils of England
Local education authorities in England
Local authorities in Shropshire
Billing authorities in England
Leader and cabinet executives
Telford and Wrekin